The James and Ella Truitt House, located at 305 N. Steuben Ave. in Chanute, Kansas, was listed on the National Register of Historic Places in 2014.

It is a Queen Anne-style house which was built in 1887.

It was deemed significant "for its association with James Truitt, a locally significant nurseryman who operated Truitt & Sons Greenhouse and founded Chanute Nurseries. This Victorian-era Queen Anne residence also is nominated ... for its local significance in the area of architecture."

References

Houses on the National Register of Historic Places in Kansas
Queen Anne architecture in Kansas
Houses completed in 1887
Neosho County, Kansas